Termit may refer to:
 P-15 Termit, a Soviet missile
 Termit Massif, a mountain range in southeast central Niger
 Termit Massif Reserve, a nature reserve covering over 700,000 hectares of the Termit Massif

See also 
 Termite (disambiguation)
 Thermite